Túlio Borges Biancalana (born 12 September 1990) is a Brazilian former footballer who played as a midfielder.

References

1990 births
Living people
Brazilian footballers
Association football midfielders
Liga I players
Liga Portugal 2 players
FC Universitatea Cluj players
Grêmio Esportivo Anápolis players
C.D. Feirense players
Brazilian expatriate footballers
Expatriate footballers in Romania
Brazilian expatriate sportspeople in Romania
Expatriate footballers in Portugal
Brazilian expatriate sportspeople in Portugal
Footballers from São Paulo